St. Louis–San Francisco 1352 is an Alco built 2-8-2 Steam locomotive. Built in 1912 as a 2-8-0 Consolidation-type by the American Locomotive Company of Schenectady, New York, for the St. Louis–San Francisco Railway (SLSF or "Frisco"), the engine was later rebuilt into a 2-8-2 Mikado-type to keep up with the traffic demands around World War II. After being retired from the Frisco, the locomotive was moved to many locations under several owners, until it ended up in a small engine house in Rural, Illinois. The locomotive was disassembled by a group with the intent to restore it. The American Steam Railroad ("ASR") was founded, and they purchased No. 1352 in 2008 to restore the locomotive to operating condition. Currently the locomotive sits partially disassembled in Taylorville, Illinois  ASR plans to move No. 1352 to Cleveland Ohio to be restored, after Reading 2100 is finished.  As of July 2022, the locomotive remains in Taylorville.

History
The locomotive was built in April 1912 as engine No. 1321, a 2-8-0 "Consolidation" type, by the American Locomotive Company at the former Schenectady Locomotive Works. Due to the demands of World War II the Frisco railroad needed more heavy power to keep up with the demands in traffic. The Wartime Production Board at that time would not allow new locomotives to be built, but would allow existing locomotives to be rebuilt, so the Frisco took the task of rebuilding 6 of their existing 2-8-0s into 2-8-2 "Mikados". In June 1944 No. 1321 was rebuilt into a 2-8-2 and renumbered 1352. The locomotive went through a major overhaul/modernization including adding of Nicholson Thermic Syphons,  Superheaters and a Coffin feedwater heater system.

The locomotive continued in regular service until it was retired in 1956, and it was subsequently donated to Swope Park in Kansas City, Missouri, for static display. Stored outside in the park, Frisco 1352 deteriorated greatly during the years on display and being exposed to the weather and vandalism took its toll on the locomotive.

Due to flooding and vandalism, the KC Park Board wanted No. 1352 to be removed, and in the late 1970s and early 1980s, it was donated to the Smoky Hill Railway and Historical Society(SHR&HS), who removed the locomotive from the park. The Missouri Pacific Railroad (MoPac) refused to allow its rail to be cut for a temporary turnout, so the movers constructed, for lack of a better description, a "vertical frog and vertical points" to lift the locomotive over the rails and then onto the MoPac mainline.

After its removal from Swope Park, the SHR&HS kept No. 1352 in an industrial park in Riverside, Missouri, where it suffered flooding on one occasion. The financially distressed SHR&HS sold the locomotive again to Ted Lemen, who moved it to Illinois for storage. As of 2021, No. 1352 is awaiting to be moved to the ex-Baltimore and Ohio roundhouse in Cleveland, Ohio for a restoration to operating condition by the American Steam Railroad.

References 

www.frisco.org

External links 
 American Steam Railroad official website
 Project 1352

1352
ALCO locomotives
Individual locomotives of the United States
2-8-2 locomotives
Standard gauge locomotives of the United States
Preserved steam locomotives of Ohio